Cymothoe hesiodotus, the orange lurid glider, is a butterfly in the family Nymphalidae. It is found in Nigeria, Cameroon, Gabon, the Republic of the Congo, the Central African Republic and the Democratic Republic of the Congo. The habitat consists of forests.

The larvae feed on Rinorea species.

Subspecies
Cymothoe hesiodotus hesiodotus (eastern Cameroon, Gabon, Congo, Central African Republic, south-central Democratic Republic of the Congo)
Cymothoe hesiodotus clarior Overlaet, 1952 (Democratic Republic of the Congo: east and from the Ituri Forest to Kindu)
Cymothoe hesiodotus nigeriensis Overlaet, 1952 (mid-western Nigeria)

References

Butterflies described in 1890
Cymothoe (butterfly)
Butterflies of Africa